George M. Strange (November 9, 1880 – June 22, 1961) was a Canadian rower who competed in the 1904 Summer Olympics. He was born in Portage la Prairie, Manitoba to George William Strange and Elizabeth Johnson and died in Toronto in 1961. He is buried in Mount Pleasant Cemetery with wife Lillian Georgina Hall Tate. At the 1904 Summer Games, held in St. Louis, he was a member of Canadian rowing team that won the silver medal in the men's eight.

References

External links
George Strange's profile at databaseOlympics

1880 births
1961 deaths
Canadian male rowers
Olympic rowers of Canada
Rowers at the 1904 Summer Olympics
Olympic silver medalists for Canada
Olympic medalists in rowing
Medalists at the 1904 Summer Olympics